Laudakia pakistanica, the Pakistani agama, a species of agamid lizard found in northern Pakistan and northern India, in the disputed territory claimed by both states.

Distribution
Three subspecies are known:
khani: Pakistan, Terra typica: Hadar (Chilas), Federal Administered Northern Area, Pakistan, 32° 25' N, 74° E, elevation 945 m.
auffenbergi: Pakistan; Terra typica: Besham, Distr. Swat, Northwest Frontier Province, Pakistan, 35° 55' N, 72° 55' E, 700 m elevation.
pakistanica: Pakistan; Terra typica: Jaglotgah, Pakistan.

References

 Ananjeva, N.B. & Tuniev 1994 Some aspects of historical biogeography of Asian rock agamids Russ. J. Herpetol. 1 (1): 43

Laudakia
Lizards of Asia
Reptiles of Pakistan
Reptiles described in 1989
Taxa named by Khalid Javed Baig
Reptiles of India